Carpheolus sublineatus is a species of beetle in the family Cerambycidae, the only species in the genus Carpheolus.

References

Acanthocinini